The Manchester Mercury was a Tory newspaper based in Manchester, England that published from 1752 until 1830.

Notes

History of Manchester
Newspapers published in Manchester
Publications disestablished in 1830
Publications established in 1752
1752 establishments in England
1830 disestablishments in England
Defunct newspapers published in the United Kingdom